The Juno Award for "International Achievement" was awarded in these following years: 1992, 1997, 1999–2000, 2017–2018 and 2022 as recognition for international achievement by musicians from Canada. The most recent recipient of this honor is Shawn Mendes.

Recipients

References 

International Achievement